Ertumaxomab (trade name Rexomun) is a rat-murine hybrid monoclonal antibody designed to treat some types of cancer.  

It is a trifunctional antibody which works by linking T-lymphocytes and macrophages to the cancer cells.

Phase II clinical trial evaluating the treatment of breast cancer was terminated due to change in Fresenius' development plans. (So they could concentrate on their other product catumaxomab (trade name Removab).)

References

Monoclonal antibodies for tumors
Immunology
Abandoned drugs